MV Cory Chouest is an ocean surveillance ship leased by the U.S. Navy in 1989 and assigned to the Navy’s Special Missions Program. Cory Chouest had all SURTASS equipment removed and was returned to her original owners in 2008 completing nearly 20 years of service.

Construction
Cory Chouest was acquired and modified by Edison Chouest Offshore for use by the U.S. Navy as a modified TAGOS vessel. The vessel served until October 2008 when it went off charter.

Mission 
The mission of Cory Chouest is to directly support the Navy by using both passive and active low frequency sonar arrays to detect and track undersea threats.

Operational history

In January 1991, the Cory Chouest and Amy Chouest were used as part of the Heard Island feasibility test, an experiment to transmit low frequency sound through the ocean from Heard Island in the Southern Indian Ocean as far as both ocean coasts of the US and Canada. The Cory Chouest was chosen because of its central moon pool and because it was already equipped with an array of low frequency transmitters. A phase-modulated 57Hz signal was used. The experiment was successful and demonstrated that such sound waves could travel as far as the antipodes. Planned transmissions had been for ten days, although owing to the bad weather conditions and the high failure rate of the transmitter elements, used at a frequency below their design frequency, the transmissions were terminated on the sixth day, when only two of the original ten transducers were still working.

Note
There is no journal entry on Cory Chouest at DANFS.

References

External links 
 NavSource Online: Service Ship Photo Archive - MV Cory Chouest
 Special Mission Program 
 Military Sealift Command - Ship Inventory – MV Cory Chouest - Ocean Surveillance Ship
 Gordon D. Tyler, Jr.,″The Emergence of Low-Frequency Active Acoustics as a Critical Antisubmarine Warfare Technology", Johns Hopkins APL Technical Digest, Vol 13, No 1 (1992) p 145.
 Chouest
 PM2 - Special Mission Support Force

Ocean surveillance ships of the United States Navy
1974 ships